Twin Peaks is an American serial drama television series created by David Lynch and Mark Frost which spans 48 episodes over three seasons. The show's original run, which comprises two seasons and 30 episodes, premiered on April 8, 1990, on ABC in the United States and ended on June 10, 1991. ABC canceled the original run due to declining ratings in the second season. The show's third season, consisting of 18 episodes, was announced in October 2014 and premiered on Showtime on May 21, 2017. The pilot and season 2 premiere are each 90 minutes long, while every other episode is approximately 45 minutes. Most episodes of the third season are approximately 60 minutes.

Twin Peaks follows FBI Special Agent Dale Cooper (Kyle MacLachlan), who is sent to the fictional town of Twin Peaks, Washington, to investigate the murder of popular and respected high school student Laura Palmer (Sheryl Lee). A feature-length prequel film, Twin Peaks: Fire Walk with Me, was released on August 28, 1992, and depicts the events leading up to Laura's death.

Both original seasons of Twin Peaks were released on DVD in the U.S., the first season in 2001 by Republic Pictures Entertainment/Artisan Home Entertainment and the second season in 2007 by Paramount Pictures Home Entertainment/CBS DVD. A DVD box set, The Definitive Gold Box Edition, was released on October 30, 2007, and included additional features. The original series and the feature-length film were released together on Blu-ray with even more material on July 29, 2014.

Series overview

Episodes

Season 1 (1990) 
The first season originally aired on ABC in the United States between April 8 and May 23, 1990, consisting of eight episodes. 

The feature-length pilot opens with the discovery of the plastic-wrapped body of high school student Laura Palmer, an event that profoundly impacts the residents of the small town of Twin Peaks, Washington. As the season progresses, FBI agent Dale Cooper and local sheriff Harry S. Truman investigate the murder and meet the town's residents, each quirky in their respective ways, as the seemingly normal appearance of the town begins to fade, revealing various secrets that expose it as disturbed and unsettling.

Season 2 (1990–91) 
The second season originally aired on ABC in the United States between September 30, 1990 and June 10, 1991, consisting of 22 episodes. 

Before the season began, a companion book, The Secret Diary of Laura Palmer, was published, several entries from which were featured during the season. In February 1991, Bob Iger, president of ABC Entertainment, announced plans to put Twin Peaks on hiatus. In May, Iger said, "it's unlikely that Twin Peaks will return". The series was ultimately cancelled after its second season, leaving it on a cliffhanger ending.

The season continues Cooper's investigation of Laura's murder and explores the elusive "Black Lodge", which may hold the key to the events occurring in Twin Peaks. After receiving clues from a mysterious giant who appears to him in a dream and investigating a second murder, Cooper discovers the identity of Laura's killer. After the FBI suspends Cooper for participating in an unauthorized raid on One Eyed Jacks, his insane former partner, Windom Earle, arrives in Twin Peaks to confront him.

Twin Peaks: Fire Walk with Me (1992)

Twin Peaks: Fire Walk with Me is a prequel to the TV series. It recounts the investigation into the murder of Teresa Banks and the last seven days of Laura Palmer's life. Director David Lynch and most of the television cast returned for the film, with the notable exceptions of Lara Flynn Boyle, who declined to return as Donna Hayward and was replaced by Moira Kelly, and Sherilyn Fenn, due to scheduling conflicts. Kyle MacLachlan returned reluctantly as he wanted to avoid typecasting, so his presence in the film is smaller than originally planned. Lynch shot about five hours of footage, which was cut to 134 minutes to allow the film a mainstream release. Many of the cut scenes were later released as Twin Peaks: The Missing Pieces in 2014. The film was a box office bomb and widely panned by critics, but has developed a cult following over time and been critically reevaluated. The release of the third season in 2017, which made many references to the film, led to renewed interest.

Season 3 (2017) 

The third season is a limited series set 25 years after the events of the season two finale. All episodes were written by David Lynch and Mark Frost. The series was originally planned to have nine episodes, but after negotiations between Lynch and Showtime, the episode order was doubled, with Lynch confirmed to direct all episodes. The season premiered on May 21, 2017, and consists of 18 episodes identified only by number, with short quotes from each serving as both de facto titles and short synopses; no additional episode information was released in advance.

Episode titles 
For the original series, creators David Lynch and Mark Frost assigned no episode titles, only numbers. When the series aired in Germany, titles were assigned, which were then translated to English. The episodes are untitled on the DVD sets, but the titled episodes appear on the official Twin Peaks CBS website and on Paramount+ when streaming the episodes. Episode 3, known as "Zen, or the Skill to Catch a Killer", is also known as "Zen and the Art of Killer-Catching". When episodes 29 and 30 aired in Germany, they were a single broadcast, with only episode 30 given a title. Fans then decided to title episode 29 "Miss Twin Peaks", which is how the episode is titled both on the CBS website and on Paramount+. When episode 29 was rerun in 1996, it was assigned a different title, "The Night of the Decision".

Notes

References

Sources

External links 
  on Showtime
  on CBS
 

 
Twin Peaks episodes, List of
Twin Peaks